The Chattian is, in the geologic timescale, the younger of two ages or upper of two stages of the Oligocene Epoch/Series. The Chattian is preceded by the Rupelian and is followed by the Aquitanian (the lowest stage of the Miocene).

Stratigraphic definition
The Chattian was introduced by Austrian palaeontologist Theodor Fuchs in 1894. Fuchs named the stage after the Chatti, a Germanic tribe. The original type locality was near the German city of Kassel.

The base of the Chattian is at the extinction of the foram genus Chiloguembelina (which is also the base of foram biozone P21b). An official GSSP for the Chattian Stage was ratified in October of 2016.

The top of the Chattian Stage (which is the base of the Aquitanian Stage, Miocene Series and Neogene System) is at the first appearance of foram species Paragloborotalia kugleri, the extinction of calcareous nanoplankton species Reticulofenestra bisecta (which forms the base of nanoplankton biozone NN1), and the base of magnetic C6Cn.2n.

The Chattian is coeval with regionally used stages or zones such as the upper Avernian European mammal zone (it spans the Mammal Paleogene zones 30 through 26 and part of 25); the upper Geringian and lower Arikareean mammal zones of North America; most of the Deseadan mammal zone of South America; the upper Hsandgolian and whole Tabenbulakian mammal zone of Asia; the upper Kiscellian and lower Egerian Paratethys stages of Central and eastern Europe; the upper Janjukian and lower Longfordian Australian regional stages; the Otaian, Waitakian, and Duntroonian stages of the New Zealand geologic time scale; and part of the Zemorrian Californian stage and Chickasawhayan regional stage of the eastern US.

Volcanic event
During the Chattian the largest known single-event volcanic eruption occurred: the Fish Canyon eruption of La Garita with a magnitude of 9.2 and VEI of 8. It has been dated to  ago.

References

Literature

 ; 1894: Tertiaerfossilien aus den kohlenführenden Miocaenablagerungen der Umgebung von Krapina und Radaboj und über die Stellung der sogenannten "Aquitanischen Stufe", Königlich- Ungarische Geologische Anstalt, Mittheilungen und Jahrbuch 10, p. 163-175. 
 ; 2004: A Geologic Time Scale 2004, Cambridge University Press.
 ; 2001: Precise K–Ar, 40Ar/39Ar, Rb–Sr and U/Pb mineral ages from the 27.5 Ma Fish Canyon Tuff reference standard, Chemical Geology 175(3–4), pp 653–671.
 ; 2004: The size and frequency of the largest explosive eruptions on Earth, Bulletin of Volcanology 66(8), pp 735–748.

External links
 Stratigraphy.org: GeoWhen Database for Chattian Age
 Purdue.edu: ICS subcommission for stratigraphic information − Neogene timescale (including the upper Paleogene) — by subcommission of International Commission on Stratigraphy− ICS.
 NorgesNetwork.no: Stratigraphic chart of the Paleogene Period — Norwegian records of offshore geology and stratigraphy.

 
Oligocene geochronology
 
Geological ages